The Ryerson Building is the older wing of the main public library in Grand Rapids, Michigan, United States.  It was the gift of  Martin A. Ryerson, a native of the city and grandson of Antoine Campau, brother of Louis Campau, founder of the city.  In 1967, the library more than doubled in size with the addition of the Keeler wing.

The building was opened in October 1904, and was extensively renovated for its centenary year.

Notes

Library buildings completed in 1904
Library buildings completed in 1967
Education in Grand Rapids, Michigan
Public libraries in Michigan
Buildings and structures in Grand Rapids, Michigan